Charles Frederick "Boots" Day (born August 31, 1947) is an American former professional baseball outfielder. He played in Major League Baseball (MLB) for the St. Louis Cardinals, Chicago Cubs, and Montreal Expos. Day is currently the bench coach for the Evansville Otters of the Frontier League.

A native of Ilion, New York, Day played Major League Baseball for all or parts of six seasons (1969–74), with the bulk of that time spent with the Montreal Expos.

Biography
Day originally signed with the St. Louis Cardinals in 1966, and received a major league trial with the Cardinals in 1969, playing in 11 games and going hitless in six at bats. At the close of the season, he was traded to the Chicago Cubs for left-handed pitcher Rich Nye. He made the Cubs' opening day 1970 roster, but was soon traded again, in May, to Montreal for veteran catcher Jack Hiatt. After further seasoning in Triple-A, at Buffalo and Winnipeg, he was recalled by the Expos and played the next three-plus seasons as Montreal's platoon center fielder.

In 1971, his best major league season, he reached career highs in hits (105), home runs (4), runs batted in (33), and batting average (.283) in 122 games played.

After slumping in 1972, he returned to form the following season, batting .275 in 101 games in 1973. But the following season, after the Expos acquired veteran center fielder Willie Davis in an offseason blockbuster trade with the Los Angeles Dodgers, Day lost his semi-regular job. After only 52 games and 72 at-bats in 1974, he returned to the minor leagues for the remainder of his playing career. His #8 uniform was then issued to rookie catcher Gary Carter in 1975; Carter went on to a Baseball Hall of Fame career and the Expos retired the number in his honour.

Day appeared in 471 MLB games (449 of them with Montreal), and batted .256 with 295 hits, 28 doubles, eight home runs and 98 runs batted in, in 1,151 at-bats.

Coaching career
After finishing his playing career in the Detroit Tigers' organization, he became a scout, minor league manager and instructor in the Detroit system. He also scouted for the Kansas City Royals. He was also the first ever manager for the Evansville Otters of the Frontier League in 1995.

In 2010, he was the hitting coach of the Calgary Vipers of the Golden Baseball League and in 2011 he held the same position with the Normal CornBelters of the Frontier League.

In 2012, Day returned to the Otters as a hitting coach, later becoming the bench coach and remaining with the club through the 2021 season.

Day retired from coaching on September 13, 2021, age 74, after a winning game with the Evansville Otters against the Lake Erie Crushers with a final score of 3–1. Day was lead off batter for the game.

References

External links

, or Retrosheet, or Pura Pelota

1947 births
Living people
American expatriate baseball players in Canada
Arkansas Travelers players
Baseball players from New York (state)
Buffalo Bisons (minor league) players
Cangrejeros de Santurce (baseball) players
Chicago Cubs players
Detroit Tigers scouts
Evansville Triplets players
Florida Instructional League Cardinals players
Kansas City Royals scouts
Lakeland Tigers players
Liga de Béisbol Profesional Roberto Clemente outfielders
Major League Baseball outfielders
Minor league baseball managers
Montreal Expos players
Navegantes del Magallanes players
American expatriate baseball players in Venezuela
People from Ilion, New York
Rock Hill Cardinals players
St. Louis Cardinals players
St. Petersburg Cardinals players
Tigres de Aragua players
Tulsa Oilers (baseball) players
Winnipeg Whips players